Creatine kinase, mitochondrial 1B also known as CKMT1B is one of two genes which encode the ubiquitous mitochondrial creatine kinase (ubiquitous mtCK or CKMT1).

Function 

Mitochondrial creatine (MtCK) kinase is responsible for the transfer of high energy phosphate from mitochondria to the cytosolic carrier, creatine. It belongs to the creatine kinase isoenzyme family. It exists as two isoenzymes, sarcomeric MtCK (CKMT2) and ubiquitous MtCK, encoded by separate genes. Mitochondrial creatine kinase occurs in two different oligomeric forms: dimers and octamers, in contrast to the exclusively dimeric cytosolic creatine kinase isoenzymes. Ubiquitous mitochondrial creatine kinase has 80% homology with the coding exons of sarcomeric mitochondrial creatine kinase. Two genes located near each other on chromosome 15 (CKMT1A and CKMT1B (this gene)) have been identified which encode identical mitochondrial creatine kinase proteins.

Clinical significance 

Many malignant cancers with poor prognosis have shown overexpression of ubiquitous mitochondrial creatine kinase; this may be related to high energy turnover and failure to eliminate cancer cells via apoptosis.

References

External links

Further reading